Introduced to Indonesia in 1930s, surfing now attracts both Indonesian and foreign surfers to numerous locations across the nation.

Surfing is a major sports industry in Indonesia, with international sports brands sponsoring professional competitions.

History
The first surfer in Indonesia was the American Bob Koke who surfed at Kuta Beach in Bali in the mid to late 1930s. 

In the late 1960s and early 1970s, Indonesian surfing beaches were featured in the surfing film Morning of the Earth and foreign surfers started coming to Bali.  The sport later spread to locations such as Nias Island, G-Land in Java, and the Mentawai Islands. 

In  2003, the Indonesian Surfing Championships (ISC) were launched by Tipi Jabrik , with the first edition in 2004 in partnership with Quiksilver.  

In 2007, surfing was admitted into the 2007 Asian Beach Games in Bali as a sport by the International Olympic Committee.

In 2008, the ISC gained a partnership with Coca-Cola Amatil Indonesia in 2008. This partnership lasted almost five years, including the creation of the Asian Surfing Championships (ASC) from the success of the ISC. 

In 2013, the Rip Curl Cup was staged at Padang Padang  (won by Mega Semadhi from Pecatu, Bali),  That same year, the Oakley Pro Bali, the 5th stop of the world tour, was staged in Bali.

Surf spots in Indonesia

Bali
Bali is considered one of the best surfing areas in the world, with many surf spots on the western and eastern coastlines . The Island provides world-class surf all year around 

 Padang Padang is located on the south west of Bali.
 Uluwatu is considered the most famous surfing spot in Bali. It is located on the south west of the island.
 Keramas is located on the south east of Bali. It is a right and left wave breaking on rocks.

Java
Java has many surf spots, the most popular one being G-Land.  It is located on the east side of Java. It is a hollow and powerful left, breaking on a sharp reef.

Lombok Island
Lombok island has several surf locations.

 Gerupuk Inside is a couple of hollow lefts and rights. It fits well for beginners.
 Gerupuk Outside is the most famous surfing spot in Lombok, it is composed of two rights a quarter of miles apart.
 Ekas is located opposite the harbour of Awang. It is right and left.
 Mawi is also located on the south coast, but at the opposite west near Selong Belanak. It is also right and left.

Mentawai Islands
The Mentawai Islanda have several surf spots accessible by boat:

 Macaroni is a hollow left located in North Pagai.
 Lance's Right is a right with hollow barrels, located in Sipore.
 Lance's Left is located near Lances Right. It is similar to Lances Right except that it is a left.

Panaitan Islands
The Panaitan Islands islands host many surf spots

 One Palm Point is a left point break with a shallow bottom.
 Apocalypse is a hollow right slab.

Sumatra
Krui is a surf beach in Lampung Province.

Sumbawa
The most famous surf posts on Sumbawa are Lakey Peak and Scar Reef.

Surfers
Bob Koke (USA) was the first surfer to ride Indonesian waves in the late 1930s. He then settled there and taught some Balinese to surf. 
 
Rizal Tanjung was the first Indonesian to compete on the WQS. He was one of the first Indonesian surfers to travel as a professional surfer. He won the Indonesian Surfing Championship circuit in 2002 and 2006. He was called "The most recognizable Asian surfer alive" by Transworld Surf magazine. He also owns Kurawa and Rizt (two brands). He appeared in many surfing videos, including Loose Change and Stranger Than Fiction.

Oney Anwar was the first surfer from Sumbawa to compete on the WQS. He learned to surf in Lakey Peak and joined the Rip Curl team when he was 10. He moved to Australia in a Rip Curl program for young surfers and came back later in Indonesia. He is now internationally known and looking to qualify for the WCT.

Raditya Rondi has been winning the Asian Surfing Championships since their creation in 2011. Indeed, he won the title of champion three consecutive years.

Surfing revenue
Surfing is a multimillion-dollar Indonesian industry.  That includes transportation, accommodation, dining, entertainment, and surfing services and products. Some islands have beach communities that make a living directly from surfing, such as Lakey Peak in Sumbawa, Sorake Beach on Nias Island, and Uluwatu Beach in Bali. 

Multinational surfing brands such as Billabong, Quiksilver, and Oakley, Inc. run their Southeast Asia operation and distribution out of their Bali headquarters.  Regional governments have held ASC surfing contests to promote their waves and beaches. 

It is estimated that the surfing business generates more than half-billion dollars in Bali alone, which represents more than 10% of the amount generated by tourism. Taking into account that the largest part of the surfers in Bali are tourists, surfing can be considered as a major part of tourism in Indonesia.

Indonesia has various other spots in other islands (like Lakey Peak or G-Land) which attract tourists only for surfing.

Dangers
Some surf spots contain sharp reefs which are best avoided by beginners. Sunburns can also pose a problem, as the sun is strong and can quickly cause burns. Shark attacks occur (though rarely), and the water is also the home of several kinds of jellyfish which can sting surfers severely.

See also

References

External links

Live surf cams in Bali
Asian Surfing Tour
Lonelyplanet.com
Surfline.com
Isasurf.org 
Asian Surfing Championships

 
Sport in Indonesia